The ARIA Club Chart ranks the best performing club music tracks within Australia and is provided by the Australian Recording Industry Association.

History
The Club Chart was established in 2001 and first published on 1 January. The chart still runs weekly . The current number one is "Rhyme Dust" by MK and Dom Dolla.

Trivia

Songs with the most weeks at number one
14 weeks
Swedish House Mafia – "Don't You Worry Child" (2012)
13 weeks
iiO – "Rapture" (2001–2002)
12 weeks
Sneaky Sound System – "Pictures" (2006–2007)
11 weeks
Fedde Le Grand – "Put Your Hands Up 4 Detroit" (2006)
Ivan Gough and Feenixpawl featuring Georgi Kay – "In My Mind" (2012)
10 weeks
Samim – "Heater" (2007)
Sidney Samson – "Riverside" (2009)
Tonite Only – "We Run the Nite" (2011)
Pnau – "Go Bang" (2018)

Artists with the most number ones
This list includes main artists and featured artists.

Jolyon Petch (11)
Colour Castle (8)
Calvin Harris (7)
Dom Dolla (7)
Sgt Slick (6)
Martin Solveig (5)
Yolanda Be Cool (5)
TV Rock (5)
Andy Murphy (4)
Peking Duk (4)

Cumulative weeks at number one
Colour Castle (33)
Armand van Helden (31)
Martin Solveig (30)
Pnau (30)
Calvin Harris (31)
Jolyon Petch (31)
TV Rock (27)
Peking Duk (20)
Sgt Slick (18)
Dom Dolla (18)
Yolanda Be Cool (17)

See also

ARIA Charts

References

Australian record charts